Naby Twimumu (born 24 August 1990) is a Luxembourgian international footballer who plays for FC Lorentzweiler, as a centre forward.

Career
Born in Kinshasa, Twimumu has played club football in Belgium and Luxembourg for Jeunesse Arlonaise, FC Swift Hesperange, CS Muhlenbach, FC Mamer 32, US Moutfort-Medingen, US Sandweiler and FC Lorentzweiler.

He earned one international cap for Luxembourg in 2008.

References

1990 births
Living people
Footballers from Kinshasa
Luxembourgian footballers
Luxembourg international footballers
Luxembourgian people of Republic of the Congo descent
FC Swift Hesperange players
FC Blue Boys Muhlenbach players
FC Mamer 32 players
US Sandweiler players
FC Lorentzweiler players
Luxembourg National Division players
Association football forwards
Luxembourgian expatriate footballers
Luxembourgian expatriates in Belgium
Expatriate footballers in Belgium